R320 road may refer to:
 R320 road (Ireland)
 R320 road (South Africa)